Gideon Trotter (born 3 March 1992) is a South African sprinter who specialises in the 100 metres.

Trotter won a gold medal in the 100 metres at the 2011 African Junior Athletics Championships in Gaborone, Botswana.

Personal best

References

External links

1992 births
Living people
South African male sprinters
Universiade medalists in athletics (track and field)
Place of birth missing (living people)
Universiade bronze medalists for South Africa
Medalists at the 2015 Summer Universiade